The Ancient Egyptian Noble Thutmose (Thutmosis) was Vizier during the latter part of the reign of Ramesses II during the 19th Dynasty.

Thutmose may have been a vizier of the south around year 45 of Ramesses II's reign. Thutmose is mentioned in vizier Prehotep II's tomb in Sedment, which may indicate that their tenures as viziers may have overlapped or followed one another. Tuthmose is also known from an ostracon found in the Valley of the Kings in Thebes.

References

Ancient Egyptian viziers
Viziers of the Nineteenth Dynasty of Egypt
Ramesses II